The 2010 Nebelhorn Trophy took place between September 23 and 26, 2010 at the Eislaufzentrum Oberstdorf. The competition is held annually in Oberstdorf, Germany and is named after the Nebelhorn, a nearby mountain.

It is one of the first international senior competitions of the season. Skaters are entered by their respective national federations and compete in four disciplines: men's singles, ladies' singles, pair skating, and ice dance. The Fritz-Geiger-Memorial Trophy was presented to the team with the highest placements across all disciplines.

Results

Men

Ladies

Pairs

Ice dance

References

External links
 2010 Nebelhorn Trophy official site
 2010 Nebelhorn Trophy

Nebelhorn Trophy
Nebelhorn
2010 in German sport